The 1981–82 New Jersey Nets season was the Nets' sixth season in the NBA.  The Nets moved their home games from the Rutgers Athletic Center in Piscataway to the Brendan Byrne Arena in East Rutherford.

Draft picks

Roster

Regular season

Season standings

z – clinched division title
y – clinched division title
x – clinched playoff spot

Record vs. opponents

Game log

Regular season

|- align="center" bgcolor="#ffcccc"
| 1
| October 30, 1981
| New York
| L 99–103
|
|
|
| Brendan Byrne Arena
| 0–1

|- align="center" bgcolor="#ffcccc"
| 2
|- align="center" bgcolor="#ffcccc"
| 3
|- align="center" bgcolor="#ffcccc"
| 4
|- align="center" bgcolor="#ccffcc"
| 5
|- align="center" bgcolor="#ffcccc"
| 6
| November 10, 1981
| @ New York
| L 99–111
|
|
|
| Madison Square Garden
| 1–5
|- align="center" bgcolor="#ffcccc"
| 7
|- align="center" bgcolor="#ffcccc"
| 8
| November 13, 1981
| @ Boston
|- align="center" bgcolor="#ccffcc"
| 9
|- align="center" bgcolor="#ffcccc"
| 10
|- align="center" bgcolor="#ffcccc"
| 11
|- align="center" bgcolor="#ffcccc"
| 12
|- align="center" bgcolor="#ccffcc"
| 13
|- align="center" bgcolor="#ffcccc"
| 14
| November 27, 1981
| @ San Antonio
|- align="center" bgcolor="#ffcccc"
| 15

|- align="center" bgcolor="#ccffcc"
| 16
|- align="center" bgcolor="#ffcccc"
| 17
| December 5, 1981
| Philadelphia
| L 105–114
|
|
|
| Brendan Byrne Arena
| 4–13
|- align="center" bgcolor="#ccffcc"
| 18
|- align="center" bgcolor="#ffcccc"
| 19
| December 9, 1981
| @ Boston
|- align="center" bgcolor="#ccffcc"
| 20
|- align="center" bgcolor="#ffcccc"
| 21
|- align="center" bgcolor="#ffcccc"
| 22
|- align="center" bgcolor="#ccffcc"
| 23
|- align="center" bgcolor="#ccffcc"
| 24
|- align="center" bgcolor="#ccffcc"
| 25
| December 23, 1981
| New York
| W 115–99
|
|
|
| Brendan Byrne Arena
| 9–16
|- align="center" bgcolor="#ccffcc"
| 26
| December 25, 1981
| @ New York
| W 96–95
|
|
|
| Madison Square Garden
| 10–16
|- align="center" bgcolor="#ffcccc"
| 27
|- align="center" bgcolor="#ffcccc"
| 28
|- align="center" bgcolor="#ccffcc"
| 29

|- align="center" bgcolor="#ffcccc"
| 30
|- align="center" bgcolor="#ccffcc"
| 31
|- align="center" bgcolor="#ffcccc"
| 32
|- align="center" bgcolor="#ccffcc"
| 33
|- align="center" bgcolor="#ccffcc"
| 34
| January 9, 1982
| @ Philadelphia
| W 120–113
|
|
|
| The Spectrum
| 14–20
|- align="center" bgcolor="#ffcccc"
| 35
| January 11, 1982
| Boston
|- align="center" bgcolor="#ccffcc"
| 36
|- align="center" bgcolor="#ffcccc"
| 37
|- align="center" bgcolor="#ccffcc"
| 38
| January 17, 1982
| Philadelphia
| W 115–107
|
|
|
| Brendan Byrne Arena
| 16–22
|- align="center" bgcolor="#ffcccc"
| 39
| January 20, 1982
| @ Los Angeles
| L 113–132
|
|
|
| The Forum
| 16–23
|- align="center" bgcolor="#ccffcc"
| 40
|- align="center" bgcolor="#ccffcc"
| 41
|- align="center" bgcolor="#ccffcc"
| 42
|- align="center" bgcolor="#ffcccc"
| 43

|- align="center" bgcolor="#ccffcc"
| 44
|- align="center" bgcolor="#ccffcc"
| 45
|- align="center" bgcolor="#ffcccc"
| 46
| February 5, 1982
| @ Philadelphia
| L 112–116
|
|
|
| The Spectrum
| 21–25
|- align="center" bgcolor="#ccffcc"
| 47
|- align="center" bgcolor="#ccffcc"
| 48
|- align="center" bgcolor="#ccffcc"
| 49
|- align="center" bgcolor="#ccffcc"
| 50
|- align="center" bgcolor="#ffcccc"
| 51
|- align="center" bgcolor="#ccffcc"
| 52
|- align="center" bgcolor="#ffcccc"
| 53
|- align="center" bgcolor="#ccffcc"
| 54
|- align="center" bgcolor="#ffcccc"
| 55
|- align="center" bgcolor="#ffcccc"
| 56
|- align="center" bgcolor="#ccffcc"
| 57
|- align="center" bgcolor="#ccffcc"
| 58

|- align="center" bgcolor="#ccffcc"
| 59
|- align="center" bgcolor="#ccffcc"
| 60
| March 3, 1982
| Los Angeles
| W 111–103
|
|
|
| Brendan Byrne Arena
| 31–29
|- align="center" bgcolor="#ccffcc"
| 61
|- align="center" bgcolor="#ffcccc"
| 62
|- align="center" bgcolor="#ccffcc"
| 63
|- align="center" bgcolor="#ffcccc"
| 64
| March 12, 1982
| Boston
|- align="center" bgcolor="#ffcccc"
| 65
|- align="center" bgcolor="#ccffcc"
| 66
| March 17, 1982
| San Antonio
|- align="center" bgcolor="#ffcccc"
| 67
|- align="center" bgcolor="#ffcccc"
| 68
|- align="center" bgcolor="#ccffcc"
| 69
| March 24, 1982
| @ Philadelphia
| W 111–106
|
|
|
| The Spectrum
| 35–34
|- align="center" bgcolor="#ffcccc"
| 70
|- align="center" bgcolor="#ffcccc"
| 71
|- align="center" bgcolor="#ccffcc"
| 72
| March 28, 1982
| New York
| W 113–106
|
|
|
| Brendan Byrne Arena
| 36–36
|- align="center" bgcolor="#ccffcc"
| 73

|- align="center" bgcolor="#ccffcc"
| 74
|- align="center" bgcolor="#ccffcc"
| 75
|- align="center" bgcolor="#ffcccc"
| 76
| April 7, 1982
| Philadelphia
| L 113–116
|
|
|
| Brendan Byrne Arena
| 39–37
|- align="center" bgcolor="#ffcccc"
| 77
| April 9, 1982
| @ Boston
|- align="center" bgcolor="#ccffcc"
| 78
|- align="center" bgcolor="#ccffcc"
| 79
| April 13, 1982
| @ New York
| W 104–102
|
|
|
| Madison Square Garden
| 41–38
|- align="center" bgcolor="#ccffcc"
| 80
|- align="center" bgcolor="#ccffcc"
| 81
| April 16, 1982
| Boston
|- align="center" bgcolor="#ccffcc"
| 82

Playoffs

|- align="center" bgcolor="#ffcccc"
| 1
| April 20
| Washington
| L 83–96
| Buck Williams (23)
| Buck Williams (13)
| Ray Williams (8)
| Brendan Byrne Arena14,015
| 0–1
|- align="center" bgcolor="#ffcccc"
| 2
| April 23
| @ Washington
| L 92–103
| Ray Williams (23)
| Len Elmore (9)
| Ray Williams (6)
| Capital Centre19,035
| 0–2
|-

Player statistics

Season

Playoffs

Awards and records
 Buck Williams, NBA Rookie of the Year Award
 Buck Williams, NBA All-Rookie Team 1st Team

Transactions

References

See also
 1981–82 NBA season

New Jersey Nets season
New Jersey Nets seasons
New Jersey Nets
New Jersey Nets
20th century in East Rutherford, New Jersey
Meadowlands Sports Complex